Gombaud may mean:

 Gombaud, a brand of wine produced in Château Lascombes
 Antoine Gombaud, Chevalier de Méré, a French writer
 Jean Ogier de Gombauld, a French playwright and poet
 Gombald or Gundobald, an Archbishop of Bordeaux